Feras Emad Salem Saleh (born 1989) is a Jordanian footballer, of Palestinian origin, who is a goalkeeper for Al-Wehdat.

References

External links 
 
Saleh on Facebook 

1989 births
Living people
Jordanian footballers
Jordan international footballers
Association football goalkeepers
Footballers at the 2010 Asian Games
Sportspeople from Amman
Al-Baqa'a Club players
Al-Wehdat SC players
Al-Yarmouk FC (Jordan) players
Al-Ramtha SC players
Al-Ahli SC (Amman) players
Asian Games competitors for Jordan